Gerhard Carl Schmidt (5 July 1865 – 16 October 1949) was a German chemist.

Life
Schmidt was born in London to German parents. He studied chemistry and in 1890 received his PhD for work with Georg Wilhelm August Kahlbaum. In 1898, two months before Marie Curie, Schmidt discovered that thorium is radioactive. Schmidt died of a stroke in Münster 16 October 1949.

See also
 List of multiple discoveries

References

External links
 Schmidt, Gerhard, Carl, Nathaniel: Complete Dictionary of Scientific Biography. Retrieved September 03, 2019 from Encyclopedia.com

1865 births
1949 deaths
19th-century German chemists
20th-century German chemists